The British royal family comprises King Charles III and his close relations. There is no strict legal or formal definition of who is or is not a member, although the Royal Household has issued different lists outlining who is a part of the royal family. They support the monarch in undertaking public engagements and often pursue charitable work and interests. The royal family are regarded as British and world cultural icons.

Members

The lord chamberlain's "List of the Royal Family" published in 2020 mentions all of King George VI's descendants and their spouses (including Sarah, Duchess of York, who is divorced), along with Queen Elizabeth II's cousins with royal rank and their spouses. The lord chamberlain's list applies for the purposes of regulating the use of royal symbols and images of the family. Meanwhile, the website of the royal family provides a list of "Members of the Royal Family"; those listed correspond to the royal family members mentioned and pictured below, with the exception of Princess Beatrice, Princess Eugenie, the Duchess of Kent, and Prince and Princess Michael of Kent.

The core of the royal family is made up of King Charles III and Queen Camilla; William, Prince of Wales and Catherine, Princess of Wales; Anne, Princess Royal; and Prince Edward, Duke of Edinburgh and Sophie, Duchess of Edinburgh. They carry out royal duties full-time.
Lower profile relatives who perform some duties are Prince Richard, Duke of Gloucester and Birgitte, Duchess of Gloucester; Prince Edward, Duke of Kent; and Princess Alexandra, The Hon. Lady Ogilvy.
Other members of the royal family with royal rank who do not carry out official duties are Prince George, Princess Charlotte, and Prince Louis of Wales; Prince Harry, Duke of Sussex and Meghan, Duchess of Sussex, Prince Archie and Princess Lilibet of Sussex; Prince Andrew, Duke of York; Princess Beatrice; Princess Eugenie; Katharine, Duchess of Kent; and Prince and Princess Michael of Kent.

Titles and surnames
 The monarch's children and grandchildren (if they are children of the monarch's sons), and the children of the eldest son of the Prince of Wales are automatically entitled to be known as prince or princess with the style His or Her Royal Highness (HRH). Peerages, often dukedoms, are bestowed upon most princes prior to marriage. Peter Phillips and Zara Tindall, children of the King's sister, Princess Anne, are therefore not prince and princess. Lady Louise Mountbatten-Windsor and James Mountbatten-Windsor, Earl of Wessex, though entitled to the dignity, are not called prince and princess as their parents, the Duke and Duchess of Edinburgh, wanted them to have more modest titles. The King reportedly wants to reduce the number of titled members of the royal family.

By tradition, wives of male members of the royal family share their husbands' title and style. Princesses by marriage do not have the title prefixed to their own name but to their husband's; for example, the wife of Prince Michael of Kent is Princess Michael of Kent. Sons of monarchs are customarily given dukedoms upon marriage, and these peerage titles pass to their eldest sons.

Male-line descendants of King George V, including women until they marry, bear the surname Windsor. The surname of the male-line descendants of Queen Elizabeth II, except for women who marry, is Mountbatten-Windsor, reflecting the name taken by her Greek-born husband, Prince Philip, Duke of Edinburgh, upon his naturalisation. A surname is generally not needed by members of the royal family who are entitled to the titles of prince or princess and the style His or Her Royal Highness. Such individuals use surnames on official documents such as marriage registers.

Public role 

Members of the royal family support the monarch in "state and national duties", while also carrying out charity work of their own. If the sovereign is indisposed, two counsellors of state are required to fulfil his role, with those notionally eligible being restricted to the Queen Consort, the Prince of Wales, the Duke of Sussex, the Duke of York, Princess Beatrice, the Duke of Edinburgh, and the Princess Royal.

Each year the family "carries out over 2,000 official engagements throughout the UK and worldwide", entertaining 70,000 guests and answering 100,000 letters. Engagements include state funerals, national festivities, garden parties, receptions, and visits to the Armed Forces. Many members have served in the Armed Forces themselves, including the King's brothers and sons. Engagements are recorded in the Court Circular, a list of daily appointments and events attended by the royal family. Public appearances are often accompanied by walkabouts, where royals greet and converse with members of the public outside events. The start of this tradition is sometimes attributed to a trip Queen Elizabeth II made in 1970 to Australia and New Zealand. Queen Elizabeth The Queen Mother also interacted with crowds on a trip to Canada in 1939 and in 1940 during The Blitz in London.

Annual events attended by the royal family include the State Opening of Parliament, Trooping the Colour, and the National Service of Remembrance. According to historian Robert Lacey, Queen Elizabeth II once said that investitures of the honours recipients are the most important thing she does. Besides the King, Prince William and Princess Anne also perform investitures. Family members represent the monarch on official visits and tours to other countries as ambassadors to foster diplomatic relations. They have also attended Commonwealth meetings on the monarch's behalf. The royal family also participates in state visits on the advice of the Foreign and Commonwealth Office, which includes the welcoming of dignitaries and a formal banquet. Journalist James Forsyth has referred to the family as "soft power assets".

Given the royal family's public role and activities, it is sometimes referred to by courtiers as "The Firm", a term that originated with George VI. Members of the royal family are politically and commercially independent, avoiding conflict of interest with their public roles. The royal family are considered British cultural icons, with young adults from abroad naming the family among a group of people who they most associated with British culture. Members are expected to promote British industry. Royals are typically members of the Church of England, headed by the monarch. When in Scotland they attend the Church of Scotland as members and some have served as Lord High Commissioner to the Church of Scotland.

Members of the royal family are patrons for approximately 3,000 charities, and have also started their own nonprofit organisations. The King started The Prince's Trust, which helps young people in the UK that are disadvantaged. Princess Anne started The Princess Royal Trust for Carers, which helps unpaid carers, giving them emotional support and information about benefit claims and disability aids. The Earl and Countess of Wessex (as the Duke and Duchess of Edinburgh were then known) founded the Wessex Youth Trust, since renamed The Earl and Countess of Wessex Charitable Trust, in 1999. The Prince and Princess of Wales are founding patrons of The Royal Foundation, whose projects revolve around mental health, conservation, early childhood, and emergency responders.

In 2019, following the negative reactions to the "Prince Andrew & the Epstein Scandal" interview, the Duke of York was forced to resign from public roles; the retirement became permanent in 2020. The Duke and Duchess of Sussex (Prince Harry and Meghan Markle) permanently withdrew from royal duties in early 2020. Following these departures, there is a shortage of royal family members to cover the increasing number of patronages and engagements.

Media and criticism

Royal biographer Penny Junor says that the royal family has presented itself "as the model family" since the 1930s. Author Edward Owen wrote that during the Second World War, the monarchy sought an image of a "more informal and vulnerable family" that had a unifying effect on the nation during instability. In 1992, the Princess Royal and her husband Mark Phillips divorced; the Prince and Princess of Wales separated; a biography detailing the Princess's bulimia and self-harming was published; her private telephone conversations surfaced, as did the Prince's intimate telephone conversations with his lover, Camilla Parker Bowles; the Duke and Duchess of York separated; and photographs of the topless Duchess having her toes sucked by another man appeared in tabloids. Historian Robert Lacey said that this "put paid to any claim to being a model of family life". The scandals contributed to the public's unwillingness to pay for the repairs to Windsor Castle after the 1992 fire. A further "PR disaster" was the royal family's initial response to the death of Diana, Princess of Wales, in 1997.

In the 1990s, the royal family formed the Way Ahead Group, made up of senior family members and advisers and headed by Elizabeth II, in a quest to change in accordance with public opinion. The 2011 wedding of Prince William and Catherine Middleton led to a "tide of goodwill", and by Elizabeth II's Diamond Jubilee in 2012 the royal family's image had recovered. A 2019 YouGov poll showed that two-thirds of British people were in favour of maintaining the royal family. The role and public relations of the extended royal family again came under increased scrutiny due to the Duke of York's friendship with convicted sex offender Jeffrey Epstein and allegations of sexual abuse, along with his unapologetic conduct in the 2019 interview about these subjects and subsequent 2021 lawsuit. In June 2019, the royal family, several members of which advocate for environmental causes, faced criticism after it was revealed that they "had doubled [their] carbon footprint from business travel".

In a 2021 interview, the Duchess of Sussex, who is of biracial heritage, relayed second-hand that there had been "concerns and conversations" within the royal family about the skin colour of their son, Archie Mountbatten-Windsor, while the Duke of Sussex stated it was a single instance. The interview received a mixed reaction from the British public and media, and several of their claims were called into question. The Duke of Cambridge said the royal family were "very much not a racist family". In June 2021, documents revealed that "coloured immigrants or foreigners" were banned by Elizabeth II's chief financial manager at the time from working for the family as clerks in the 1960s, prompting black studies professor Kehinde Andrews to state that "the royal family has a terrible record on race". In response, the palace stated that it complied "in principle and in practice" with anti-discrimination legislation, and that second-hand claims of "conversations from over 50 years ago should not be used to draw or infer conclusions about modern-day events or operations." In March 2022 and during the Caribbean tour of the then Duke and Duchess of Cambridge as part of the Queen's Platinum Jubilee celebrations, the family encountered criticism from a number of political figures and the press, given their past connections to colonialism and the Atlantic slave trade via the Royal African Company. Reparations for slavery emerged as a major demand of protesters during the couple's visit. Both the then Prince of Wales and Duke of Cambridge have condemned slavery in their speeches, and the Prince has described acknowledging the wrongs of the past as a necessity for the Commonwealth countries to realise their potential.

Historically, the royal family and the media have benefited from each other; the family used the press to communicate with the public, while the media used the family to attract readers and viewers. With the advent of television, however, the media started paying less respect to the royal family's privacy. Princes William and Harry have had informal arrangements with the press whereby they would be left alone by the paparazzi during their education in return for invitations to staged photograph opportunities. William has continued the practice with his family posts on Instagram. Relations between the media and British royals have been destabilized by the rise of the digital media, with the quantity of articles becoming paramount toward gaining advertising revenue, with neither side able to exercise control. In the 2000s, the phones of Prince William and Catherine Middleton, and Prince Harry and his then-girlfriend Chelsy Davy, were hacked multiple times by media outlets, most notably by a private investigator working for a News of the World journalist. A 2021 BBC documentary suggested that briefings and counter-briefings from different royal households was the reason behind the negative coverage about members of the royal family. Buckingham Palace, Clarence House and Kensington Palace, which represented the Queen, the then Prince of Wales and Duke of Cambridge respectively, described these suggestions as "overblown and unfounded claims".

Funding

Senior members of the royal family, who represent the monarch, draw their income from public funds known as the sovereign grant. The sovereign grant is an annual payment of the British government to the monarch. It comes from the revenues of the Crown Estate, which are commercial properties owned by the Crown. It is common belief amongst the British public that funding for the royal family comes from taxpayers' money, but this is not the case. The revenue of the crown estate actually far exceeds the amount provided in the sovereign grant. Members of the royal family who receive money from the sovereign grant must be accountable to the public for it and are not allowed to make money from their name.

The security of the royal family is not paid from the sovereign grant but is usually met instead by the Metropolitan Police. The royal family, the Home Office, and the Metropolitan Police decide which members have a right to taxpayer-funded police security. Extended members do not retain automatic right to protection; in 2011, Princesses Beatrice and Eugenie ceased receiving police security.

Residences

The sovereign's official residence in London is Buckingham Palace. Announcements of the births and deaths of members of the royal family are traditionally attached to its front railings. Both Buckingham Palace and Windsor Castle, the monarch's weekend home in Berkshire, are used to host state visits. The Palace of Holyroodhouse and Hillsborough Castle serve as official royal residences when the monarch is in Scotland or Northern Ireland, respectively.

Clarence House served as the official residence of Charles III when he was Prince of Wales from 2003 until he inherited the throne on 8 September 2022. Another London residence of his when Prince of Wales was St James's Palace, which he shared with the Princess Royal and Princess Alexandra. Princess Alexandra also resides at Thatched House Lodge in Richmond. The King also privately owns Sandringham House in Norfolk and Balmoral Castle in Aberdeenshire, which are his personal property. He inherited them from Elizabeth II upon her death. 
 
The Prince and Princess of Wales and the Duke and Duchess of Gloucester have their official residences and offices at apartments in Kensington Palace, London. The Duke and Duchess of Kent reside in Wren House in the grounds of Kensington Palace. The Duke and Duchess of Sussex's official residence in the United Kingdom is Frogmore Cottage, near Windsor.  The Duke of York lives at the Royal Lodge in Windsor Great Park, while the Duke and Duchess of Edinburgh reside at Bagshot Park in Surrey.

See also
Changes to royal titles after the death of Elizabeth II
Education of the British royal family
List of honours of the British royal family by country
List of longest-living members of the British royal family
Military service by British royalty
Republicanism in the United Kingdom
Royal descent

References

Further reading
Burke's Guide to the Royal Family. Burke's Peerage, 1973.
Cannon, John Ashton. The Oxford Illustrated History of the British Monarchy. Oxford University Press, 1988.
Churchill, Randolph S. They Serve the Queen: A New and Authoritative Account of the Royal Household ("Prepared for Coronation Year"). Hutchinson, 1953.
Fraser, Antonia (ed). The Lives of the Kings & Queens of England. Revised & updated edition. University of California Press, 1998.
Hayden, Ilse. Symbol and Privilege: The Ritual Context of British Royalty. University of Arizona Press, 1987.
Longford, Elizabeth Harman (Countess of Longford). The Royal House of Windsor. Revised edition. Crown, 1984.
Weir, Alison. Britain's Royal Families: The Complete Genealogy. Pimlico/Random House, 2002.
Royal Family (1969) is a celebrated and reverential BBC documentary made by Richard Cawston to accompany the investiture of the current Prince of Wales. The documentary is frequently held responsible for the greater press intrusion into the royal family's private life since its first broadcast.

External links

 
  

 
 
Royal family
British monarchy